Numerous lexemes that are reconstructable for Proto-Slavic have been identified as borrowings from the languages of various tribes that Proto-Slavic speakers interacted with in either prehistoric times or during their expansion when they first appeared in history in the sixth century (the Common Slavic period). Most of the loanwords come from Germanic languages, with other contributors being Iranian, Celtic, and Turkic. Slavic loanwords sparked numerous debates in the 20th century, some of which persist today.

Linguists Max Vasmer and Oleg Trubachyov compiled and published academic dictionaries on Slavic languages that are used worldwide in academia and are considered the most accurate sources for Slavic etymology. Another etymological dictionary written by G.P. Cyganenko takes a more modern look at the theories presented by Vasmer and others, and mostly explains origins for words that are most common and is not as extensive as the works of Vasmer or Trubachev.

Slavic and Iranian
Slavs in the Proto-Slavic era came into contact with various Iranian tribes, namely Scythians, Sarmatians, and Alans, who were present in vast regions of eastern and southeastern Europe in the first centuries CE. The names of two large rivers in the centre of Slavic expansion, Dnieper and Dniester, are of Iranian origin, and Iranian toponyms are found as far west as modern-day Romania.

For a long time there have been investigators who believe that the number of loanwords from Iranian languages in Proto-Slavic is substantial. However, other Slavists claimed that confirmed Iranianisms in Slavic are few in number, and Ranko Matasović has raised broad objections to the body of past Iranianist research. Antoine Meillet and André Vaillant explain the alleged lack of Iranianisms in Slavic: "the civilization of warrior and partially nomadic tribes, like Scythian and Sarmatian, could have exerted only a cursory influence on the patriarchal civilization of Slavs".

Matasović criticizes Zbigniew Gołąb's approach as "methodologically unacceptable", emphasizing that initial *x- in Slavic has several sources, some of which have been ascertained (like PIE *#ks-) and others which have not. Matasović recommends that instances of initial *x- in Slavic should first be explained by recourse to regular Slavic sound laws, and that Iranian should be proposed as a source if and only if the etymon has been attested in Iranian, and if and only if there is additional phonetic evidence to support the proposal.

Meillet and Vaillant considered that the semasiological development of the Proto-Slavic word for god was an Iranianism. In both Slavic and Indo-Iranian, the root that denotes deity also denotes wealth, share (Proto-Slavic *bagu > Common Slavic *bogъ) and Indo-Iranian (Old Persian baga, Sanskrit bhága).

One of the Iranian-Slavic lexical isoglosses is a lone adposition: Old Persian rādiy, OCS radi.

Slavic and Germanic
It is uncertain when Proto-Slavic speakers first came into contact with Germanic tribes: among Common Balto-Slavic words that have centum reflexes, none of them have typical Germanic sound-features. As for Baltic languages, all their prehistoric Germanic loanwords either come from Slavic or are borrowed from Old Norse or Proto-Norse; i.e., borrowed during a period well after Slavic prehistory (which ended  600 CE). The conclusion is that the speakers of Germanic must have lived far from the area of the subsequent spread of speakers of Proto-Balto-Slavic.  Gothic loanwords into Slavic (as opposed to Baltic) occur much more frequently.

There follows a list of words which are generally held to be Germanic loanwords in Proto-Slavic:
 PSl. *asilu, donkey (OCS osьlъ) < Goth. asil- (< Lat. asellus);
 PSl. *bergu, hill (OCS brěgъ) < Germanic *bergaz (cf. German Berg); Many scientists have rejected this theory of Germanic origin of the word and rather consider it an Indo-European cognate.
 PSl. *bjōda, bowl (OCS bljudo)  < Goth. biuda;
 PSl. *bōkū, letter (OCS buky) < Goth. bōkō;
 PSl. *činda, child, infant (OCS čędo) < Germanic *kinda (cf. German Kind); This word was originally believed to be of Germanic origin but many scientists have refuted that theory and the word is now considered to be an Indo-European cognate.
 PSl. *gardu, enclosed space (OCS gradъ) < Goth. gards, court; The theory of this word being a Germanic loan has been rejected by many scientists, and it is now considered to be of Slavic origin.
 PSl. *ganeznantej, to grow healthy (OCS goneznǫti) < Goth. ganisan;
 PSl. *kōpītej, to buy (OCS kupiti) < Goth. kaupjan (< Lat. caupo) (cf. German kaufen);
 PSl. *kōsītej, to test, taste (OCS kusiti) < Goth. kausjan;
 PSl. *kuningu, duke (OCS kъnędzь) < Germanic *kuningaz (cf. OE cyning, OHG chuning);
 PSl. *lēku, cure (OCS lěkъ) < Germanic *lēka (cf. Gothic lēkareis, doctor);
 PSl. *lōku, onion, leek (OCS lukъ) < Germanic *lauka- (cf. OHG lauh, OIcel. laukr);
 PSl. *nōta, cattle (OCS nuta) < Germanic *nauta;
 PSl. *ōseringu, ear-ring (OESl. userjazъ) < Goth. ausihriggs;
 PSl. *pulku, folk (OCS plъkъ) < Germanic *fulkan (cf. OE, OHG folc);
 PSl. *skulingu, small money (OCS skъlędzь) < Goth. skilling;
 PSl. *skatu, cattle (OCS skotъ) < Germanic *skatta (cf. German Schatz, treasure);
 PSl. *smakū, fig (OCS smoky) < Goth. smakka;
 PSl. *šelmu, helmet (OCS šlěmъ) < Germanic *helma- (cf. OHG helm);
 PSl. *tūnu, fence (OCS tynъ) < Germanic *tūnaz < Celtic *dūno, fortification (cf. OIr dún);
 PSl. *xlaiwu, pigsty (OCS xlěvъ) < Germanic *hlaiwan;
 PSl. *xlajbu, bread (OCS xlěbъ) < Germanic *hlaibaz;
 PSl. *xulmu, hummock (OCS xъlmъ) < Germanic *hulma-;
 PSl. *xūzu, xūsu, house (OCS xyzъ) < Germanic *hūsan, *hūzan;
 PSl. *želdān, to compensate damage (OCS žlěsti) < Germanic *geldan, to buy out.

This set of loanwords covers diverse semantic fields, fields from which languages readily borrow words: buildings (*xūzu,*tūnu); terrain features (*xulmu, *bergu); social interaction and societal structure (*pulku, *želdān, *kōpītej, *činda); animals and cattle (*asilu, *skatu).

Slavic and Celtic
By the time Slavs start to appear in historical records, Celtic languages were already limited to the British Isles and modern-day France. However, during the age of classical antiquity, Celts populated the regions of Central Europe in which Slavs spread in the 6th and the 7th century, there may have been speakers of Celtic languages in the regions of Slavic expansion. Two likely examples of direct borrowings from Celtic are
 PSl. *karwā ‘cow’ (Pol. krowa, Russ. koróva, SCr. krȁva), postulated by some to be a feminine derivative of a lost masculine noun supposedly borrowed from Proto-Celtic *karwos ‘deer’ (Welsh carw, Breton karv, Cornish karow), which would in turn be a regular Celtic centum reflex of PIE . Lithuanian kárvė, whose accentuation matches that of the Slavic etymons, points to prehistorical Balto-Slavic borrowing, but this hypothesis does not take into account Old Prussian curwis ‘ox’, and the Slavic protoform is usually reconstructed as PSl. *kòrva, inherited with incomplete satemization from an o-grade PIE variant .
 PSl. *krawu ‘roof’ (OCS krovъ, Czech/Russ. krov) is traced by some to Germanic etymons with the same meaning (OE hrōf, ON hróf etc.); if Celtic mediation is assumed, from dialectal PIE *ḱrōpo- > Proto-Celtic *krāfo- (cf. MIr cró ‘enclosure’, Welsh crau ‘hovel, pigsty’). However, the Slavic preform is usually reconstructed as PSl. *kròvъ and considered a derivative of *krỳti ‘to cover, hide’. Furthermore, the Celtic words are unrelated to Germanic (< *hrōfa- < *ḱrōpo-), stemming instead from Proto-Celtic *krewo- ~ kruwo-, presumably from PIE  ‘to hide’.

Slavic and Greek
Ancient Greek words in Proto-Slavic are identified through phonetic features, some related to Greek phonetic history, others possibly Scythian-Sarmatian or Gothic mediations. Non-mediated Ancient Greek words are korablja (ark), koliba (cottage, hut), and supposedly trem (porch); Scythian mediations are luk (onion), haluga (fence), koš (basket), talog (dregs), kurva (whore); supposedly Gothic mediations are crkva (church) and daska (plank).

Other Indo-European languages
Speculations as to contacts between Proto-Slavic speakers and other Indo-European languages are frequent in the literature on Slavic historical linguistics. Proposals include the Italic, Illyrian, Thracian, Venetic, and Armenian languages.

Notes

References

 
 
  Holzer, Georg. 1990. Germanische Lehnwörter im Urslavischen: Methodologisches zu ihrer Identifizierung. Croatica, Slavica, Indoeuropea. Wien: Österreichischen Akademie der Wissenschaften. Series: Wiener Slawistisches Jahrbuch, Ergänzungsband; VIII. 59–67.
 
 
 
 
  Meillet, Antoine; André Vaillant. 1934. Le slave commun. Paris: H. Champion.
 Saskia Pronk-Tiethoff. The Germanic Loanwords in Proto-Slavic. Amsterdam: Rodopi, 2013.
 
 https://lexicography.online/etymology/vasmer/

Further reading

  (temporarily bad link, try first page)

 Derksen, Rick (2021). "Notes on Three Proto-Slavic Borrowings“. In: Vilnius University Open Series, liepos, 138-48. https://doi.org/10.15388/SBOL.2021.7.
 
 
 Noińska, Marta, i Mikołaj Rychło (2017). "From Proto-Slavic into Germanic or from Germanic into Proto-Slavic? A Review of Controversial Loanwords”. In: Studia Rossica Gedanensia, nr 4 (grudzień):39-52. https://doi.org/10.26881/srg.2017.4.02.
 
 Pronk-Tiethoff, Saskia. "THE MAIN CORPUS: GERMANIC LOANWORDS IN PROTO-SLAVIC". In: The Germanic loanwords in Proto-Slavic. Leiden, The Netherlands: Brill, 2013. pp. 77–167. doi: https://doi.org/10.1163/9789401209847_008
 
 
 

Borrowing
Slavic words and phrases
Proto-Slavic
Reconstructed words